The Pakistan A cricket team, or Pakistan Shaheens, is a national cricket team representing Pakistan. It is the second-tier of international Pakistan cricket, below the full Pakistan national cricket team. Matches played by Pakistan A are not considered to be Test matches or One Day Internationals, receiving first-class and List A classification respectively. Pakistan A played their first match in August 1964, a three-day first-class contest against Ceylon Board President's XI.

Pakistan A have played a number of series, both home and away, against other national A teams, and competed against other first-class opposition. Their first tour was to Ceylon (now Sri Lanka) in 1964–65.  Pakistan A did not play another match until the 1991 season when they again toured Sri Lanka, a series against England A the previous season having been cancelled due to the Gulf War.

References

External links
 Cricket Archive page for Pakistan A Cricket Team
 Cricinfo page for Pakistan A Cricket Team
 CricketnLive page for Pakistan A Cricket Team
 Cricnscore page for Pakistan A Cricket Team

C
 Pakistan in international cricket
 National 'A' cricket teams